The Royal Institution Christmas Lectures are a series of lectures on a single topic each, which have been held at the Royal Institution in London each year since 1825, missing 1939–1942 because of the Second World War. The lectures present scientific subjects to a general audience, including young people, in an informative and entertaining manner. Michael Faraday initiated the Christmas Lecture series in 1825, at a time when organised education for young people was scarce. Faraday presented nineteen series of lectures in all.

History

The Royal Institution's Christmas Lectures were first held in 1825, and have continued on an annual basis since then except for four years during the Second World War. They have been hosted each year at the Royal Institution itself, except in 1929 and between 2005 and 2006, each time due to refurbishment of the building. They were created by Michael Faraday, who later hosted the lecture season on nineteen occasions. The Nobel laureate Sir William Bragg gave the Christmas lectures on four occasions, and his co-laureate son Sir Lawrence Bragg gave them twice. Other notable lecturers have included Desmond Morris (1964), Eric Laithwaite (1966 & 1974), Sir George Porter (1969 & 1976), Sir David Attenborough (1973), Heinz Wolff (1975), Carl Sagan (1977), Richard Dawkins (1991), Baroness Susan Greenfield (1994), Dame Nancy Rothwell (1998), Monica Grady (2003), Sue Hartley (2009), Alison Woollard (2013), Danielle George (2014), and Saiful Islam (2016).

The props for the lectures are designed and created by the RI's science demonstration technician, a post which Faraday previously held. A popular technician, with the advent of television, serving from 1948 to 1986, was Bill Coates. The technician is informed of the general subject of the lectures during spring, but the specifics aren't settled until September, with the recordings made in mid-December. By 2009, the lectures had expanded to a series of five sessions each year. However, in 2010 the Royal Institution cut back on costs as it had become over £2 million in debt. These cost-cutting measures included the budget allotted to the Christmas Lectures. This resulted in a reduction from five sessions to three.

Television
A single Christmas Lecture, by G. I. Taylor, was the first to be televised, in 1936, on the BBC's fledgling Television Service. They were broadcast on BBC Two from 1966 to 1999 and Channel 4 from 2000 to 2004. In 2000 one of the lectures was broadcast live for the first time. Following the end of Channel 4's contract to broadcast the lectures, there were concerns that they might simply be dropped from scheduling as the channel was negotiating with the Royal Institution over potential changes to the format, while the BBC announced that "The BBC will not show the lectures again, because it feels the broadcasting environment has moved on in the last four years." Channel Five subsequently agreed to show the lectures from 2005 to 2008, an announcement which was met with derision from academics. The lectures were broadcast on More4 in 2009. In 2010, the lectures returned to the BBC after a ten-year absence from the broadcaster, and have been shown on BBC Four each year since then.

In 1994, Professor Susan Greenfield became the first female scientist to present the Christmas Lectures. The first non-white science lecturer was Kevin Fong in 2015, and in August 2020 it was announced that Professor Christopher Jackson would jointly present the 2020 lecture series, thus becoming the first black scientist to do so.

In January 2022, the RI launched an appeal to trace copies of those televised lectures which are missing from the BBC's archives, these being the complete series of five lectures each from 1966, 1967, 1969, 1970 and 1971, plus one episode of David Attenborough's 1973 lectures, "The language of animals".

List of Christmas lectures

1825 to 1965 
The following is a complete list of the Christmas Lectures from 1825 to 1965:

Since 1966 
The following is a list of televised Christmas Lectures from 1966 onward :

References

External links 
Christmas Lectures online (The Ri Channel)

Annual events in the United Kingdom
BBC Television shows
British lecture series
Channel 4 original programming
Channel 5 (British TV channel) original programming
Christmas in the United Kingdom
Education in London
Christmas Lectures
Recurring events established in 1825
Science education in the United Kingdom
December events
Science and technology in the United Kingdom
1825 establishments in the United Kingdom